Chautauqua is a hamlet and census-designated place (CDP) in the town of Chautauqua in Chautauqua County, New York, United States. It corresponds to the area of the Chautauqua Institution, a historic district, adult education center, and summer resort on the southwest shore of Chautauqua Lake in far western New York. The permanent residential population was 191 at the 2010 census.

Geography
The CDP is bordered on the northeast by Chautauqua Lake and on the southwest by New York State Route 394, West Lake Road.

Demographics

References

Hamlets in New York (state)
Census-designated places in New York (state)
Census-designated places in Chautauqua County, New York
Hamlets in Chautauqua County, New York